The demography of Germany is monitored by the Statistisches Bundesamt (Federal Statistical Office of Germany). According to the most recent data, Germany's population is 84,270,625 (30 September 2022) making it the most populous country in the European Union and the nineteenth-most populous country in the world. The total fertility rate was rated at 1.58 in 2021, significantly below the replacement rate of 2.1. For a long time Germany had one of the world's lowest fertility rates of around 1.3 to 1.4, however there has been a small increase in recent years. Due to the low birth rate Germany has recorded  more deaths than births every year since 1972, which means 2021 was the 50th consecutive year the German population would have decreased without immigration. However, due to immigration the population has actually increased during the last half-century. In 2019 the number of people with a foreign background was 26%; this category includes foreigners, naturalized citizens, ethnic German repatriates from Eastern Europe and the children of all of the above.

Until the early 20th century Germany was also a large emigrant nation; in the 19th century more than 5 million citizens of the German Empire emigrated to the US alone, and in the early 20th century Germany lost another two million to the US as well as significant numbers to Latin America, Canada and Eastern Europe. However, after World War II immigration began to outweigh emigration, as around 14 million ethnic Germans were expelled from the former eastern provinces of the Reich and other areas in Eastern Europe. Of these, roughly 12 million made their way to present-day Germany and several hundred thousand settled in Austria and other countries, while several hundred thousand died. Some additional 4.5 million ethnic Germans from Eastern Europe repatriated after 1950, especially around the end of the Eastern Bloc and mostly from the former Soviet Union, Poland and Romania.

Large-scale immigration to West Germany began during the time of the Wirtschaftswunder from the 1950s to early 1970s when Germany had a shortage of workers and let in Southern Europeans from countries like Turkey, Italy and Spain on a temporary basis as guest workers. The liberalisation of guest worker legislation allowed many to stay and build a life in West Germany. Germany saw another large wave of immigration towards the end of the 20th century, driven by German reunification, refugee inflows from the Yugoslav Wars and large numbers of Turkish nationals seeking asylum. The next large immigration wave began after eastern expansion of the European Union in 2011 as Eastern Europeans were now allowed to live and work in Germany without a visa. During the European migrant crisis of the mid 2010s Germany took in a large number of refugees, both in absolute terms and relative to other EU member states; the country recorded 476,649 asylum seekers in 2015, 745,545 in 2016 and declining numbers thereafter.

Germany has one of the world's highest levels of education, technological development, and economic productivity. Since the end of World War II, the number of students entering university has more than tripled, and the trade and technical schools are among the world's best. With a per capita income of about €40,883 in 2018, Germany is a broadly middle-class society. However, there has been a strong increase in the number of children living in poverty. In 1965, one in 75 children was on the welfare rolls; but by 2007 this had increased to one child in six. These children live in relative poverty, but not necessarily in absolute poverty. Millions of Germans travel overseas each year. The social welfare system provides for universal health care, unemployment compensation, child benefits and other social programmes. Germany's aging population and struggling economy strained the welfare system in the 1990s, so the government adopted a wide-ranging programme of – still controversial – belt-tightening reforms, Agenda 2010, including the labour-market reforms known as Hartz concept.

History

1945–1990

After the World War II border shifts and expulsions, the Germans from Central and Eastern Europe and the former eastern territories moved westward to post-war Germany. During the partition of Germany, many Germans from East Germany fled to West Germany for political and economic reasons. Since Germany's reunification, there are ongoing migrations from the eastern New Länder to the western Old Länder for economic reasons.

The Federal Republic of Germany and the German Democratic Republic followed different paths when it came to demographics. The politics of the German Democratic Republic was pronatalistic while that of the Federal Republic was compensatory.

Fertility in the GDR was higher than that in the FRG. Demographic politics was only one of the reasons. Women in the GDR had fewer "biographic options", young motherhood was expected of them. State funded costfree childcare was available to all mothers.

Mother's mean age at first birth in East and West Germany
Note: Berlin is included into East Germany for the year 2002 and 2008. Source: Kreyenfeld (2002); Kreyenfeld et al. (2010); HFD Germany (2010)

1990–today

About 1.7 million people have left the new federal states (the East) since the fall of the Berlin Wall, or 12% of the population; a disproportionately high number of them were women under 35.

After 1990, the total fertility rate (TFR) in the East dropped to 0.772 in 1994. This has been attributed to a "demographic shock": people not only had fewer children, they were also less likely to marry or divorce after the end of the GDR; the biographic options of the citizens of the former GDR had increased. Young motherhood seemed to be less attractive and the age of the first birth rose sharply.

In the following years, the TFR in the East started to rise again, surpassing 1.0 in 1997 and 1.3 in 2004, and reaching the West's TFR (1.37) in 2007. In 2010, the East's fertility rate (1.459) clearly exceeded that of the West (1.385), while Germany's overall TFR had risen to 1.393, the highest value since 1990, which was still far below the natural replacement rate of 2.1 and the birth rates seen under communism. In 2016, the TFR was 1.64 in the East and 1.60 in the West.

Between 1989 and 2009, about 2,000 schools closed because there were fewer children.

In some regions the number of women between the ages of 20 and 30 has dropped by more than 30%. In 2004, in the age group 18–29 (statistically important for starting families) there were only 90 women for every 100 men in the new federal states (the East, including Berlin).

Until 2007 family politics in the federal republic was compensatory, which means that poor families received more family benefits (such as the Erziehungsgeld) than rich ones. In 2007 the so-called Elterngeld was introduced. According to Christoph Butterwegge the Elterngeld was meant to "motivate highly educated women to have more children"; the poor on the other hand were disadvantaged by the Elterngeld, and now received lower child benefits than the middle classes. The very well-off (who earn more than 250.000 Euro per annum) and those on welfare receive no Elterngeld payments.

In 2013 the following most recent developments were noticed:

 The income of families with young children has risen. Persons holding a college degree, persons older than 30 years and parents with only one child benefited the most. Single parents and young parents did not benefit.
 Fathers are becoming more involved in parenting, and 28% of them now take some time off work (3.3 months on average) when their children are born.
 Mothers are more likely to work and as a result less likely to be economically deprived than they used to be.
 The birth rate of college-educated women has risen.

In the new federal states the fertility rate of college-educated women is now higher than that of those without college degrees. Differences in value priorities and the better availability of childcare in the eastern states are discussed as possible reasons.

In 2019, the non-profit Austrian Institute of Economic Research and the Bertelsmann Stiftung published a study about the economic impact of demographics. The researchers assume a reduction in the per capita income of €3,700 until 2040.

Population

The contemporary demographics of Germany used to also be measured by a series of full censuses mandated by the state, with the most recent held in 1987. Since reunification, German authorities rely on a micro census.
Demographic statistics according to the World Population Review. Due to the privacy concerns of the German population after reunification, Germany didn't hold a regular census until the EU-mandated 2011 German Census. The requirement was met with large disapproval. As required by the EU, Germany now continues to hold censuses every 10 years.
One birth every 43 seconds
One death every 34 seconds
Net gain of one person every 4 minutes
One net migrant every 2 minutes

Population growth 

Population growth rate

–0.17% (2018 est.) Country comparison to the world: 208th

Fertility
The total fertility rate is the number of children born per woman. It is based on fairly good data for the entire period. Sources: Our World In Data and Gapminder Foundation.

Mother's mean age at first birth

29.4 years (2015 est.)

Life expectancy 
Sources: Our World In Data and the United Nations.

1875–1950

1950–2015

Source: UN World Population Prospects

Life expectancy at birth

total population: 80.8 years. Country comparison to the world: 34th
male: 78.5 years
female: 83.3 years (2017 est.)

Age structure 

0–14 years: 12.83% (male 5,299,798 /female 5,024,184)
15–24 years: 9.98% (male 4,092,901 /female 3,933,997)
25–54 years: 39.87% (male 16,181,931 /female 15,896,528)
55–64 years: 14.96% (male 5,989,111 /female 6,047,449)
65 years and over: 22.36% (male 7,930,590 /female 10,061,248) (2018 est.)

Median age:
total: 47.4 years. Country comparison to the world: 3rd
male: 46.2 years
female: 48.5 years (2018 est.)

Vital statistics

Statistics since 1817
Population statistics since 1817. Territorial changes of Germany occurred in 1866 (establishment of North German Confederation, 1871) (German unification and annexation of Alsace-Lorraine), 1918/1919, 1921/1922, 1945/1946 and in 1990. Death data is incomplete for both world wars, especially WWII.

In 2020, 586,421 (75.8%) children were born to mothers with German citizenship, while 91,872 (11.9%) children were born to mothers with European citizenship (excluding Turkey) and 94,851 (12.3%) children were born to mothers with other citizenship.

In 2021, 605,703 (76.1%) children were born to mothers with German citizenship, while 95,282 (12%) children were born to mothers with European citizenship (excluding Turkey) and 94,532 (11.9%) children were born to mothers with other citizenship.

Current vital statistics

Social issues 
Most childbirths in Germany happen within marriage. Out of 778,080 births in 2019 258,835 were to unmarried parents, which means that around 33% or one third of the children are born out of wedlock, while two thirds are within. This percentage of unmarried birth has long been growing and reached 33% in 2010, more than twice of what it was in 1990. However in recent years it has started to stagnate or even decrease.

The Mikrozensus done in 2008 revealed that the number of children a German woman aged 40 to 75 had, was closely linked to her educational achievement.
In Western Germany the most educated women were the most likely to be childless. 26% of those groups stated they were childless, while 16% of those having an intermediate education, and 11% of those having compulsory education, stated the same.
In Eastern Germany however, 9% of the most educated women of that age group and 7% of those who had an intermediary education were childless, while 12% of those having only compulsory education were childless.

The reason for that east-western difference is that the GDR had an "educated mother scheme" and actively tried to encourage first births among the more educated. It did so by propagandizing the opinion that every educated woman should "present at least one child to socialism" and also by financially rewarding its more educated citizen to become parents. The government especially tried to persuade students to become parents while still in college and it was quite successful in doing so. In 1986 38% of all women, who were about to graduate from college, were mothers of at least one child and additional 14% were pregnant and 43% of all men, who were about to graduate from college, were fathers of at least one child. There was a sharp decline in the birth rate and especially in the birth rate of the educated after the fall of the Berlin wall. Nowadays, 5% of those about to graduate from college are parents.

The more educated a Western German mother aged 40 to 75 was in 2008, the less likely she was to have a big family.

The same was true for a mother living in Eastern Germany in 2008.

In 2011, this trend was reversed in Eastern Germany, where more highly educated women now had a somewhat higher fertility rate than the rest of the population.

Persons who said they had no religion tend to have fewer children than those who identify as Christians, and studies also found that conservative-leaning Christians had more children compared to liberal-leaning Christians.

A study done in 2005 in the western German state of Nordrhein-Westfalen by the HDZ revealed that childlessness was especially widespread among scientists. It showed that 78% of the women scientists and 71% of the male scientists working in that state were childless.

Ethnic minorities and migrant background (Migrationshintergrund)
Germany does not collect data on the ethnic and racial identifications of its citizens, but does collect data on the background group by birth of an individual. The Federal Statistical Office defines persons with a migrant background as all persons who migrated to the present area of the Federal Republic of Germany after 1949, plus all foreign nationals born in Germany and all persons born in Germany as German nationals with at least one parent who migrated to Germany or was born in Germany as a foreign national. The figures presented here are based on this definition only.

In 2010, 2.3 million families with children under 18 years were living in Germany, in which at least one parent had foreign roots. They represented 29% of the total of 8.1 million families with minor children. Compared with 2005 – the year when the microcensus started to collect detailed information on the population with a migrant background – the proportion of migrant families has risen by 2 percentage points. In 2019, 40% children under 5 years old had migrant background.

Most of the families with a migrant background live in the western part of Germany. In 2010, the proportion of migrant families in all families was 32% in the former territory of the Federal Republic. This figure was more than double that in the new Länder (incl. Berlin) where it stood at 15%. Eastern Germany has a much lower proportion of immigrants than the West, as the GDR did not let in that many guest workers and Eastern Germany's economy is not doing as well as West Germany's and had a higher percentage of jobless persons until recently. However in recent years the number of people with an immigrant background in East Germany has been growing as refugees (as well as German Repatriates) are distributed with the Königssteiner Schlüssel, so every German state has to take the same number of them compared to its population and economy. In 2019 19.036 million people or 89,6% of people with an immigrant background live in Western Germany (excluding Berlin), being 28,7% of its population, while 1.016 million people with immigrant background 4,8% live in Eastern States, being 8,2% of population, and 1.194 million people with an immigrant background 5,6% live in Berlin, being 33,1% of its population.

In 2019, 26% of Germans of any age group (up from 18,4% in 2008) and 39% of German children (up from 30% in 2008) had at least one parent born abroad. Average age for Germans with at least one parent born abroad was 35.6 years (up from 33.8 years in 2008), while that for Germans, who had two parents born in Germany was 47.3 years (up from 44.6 in 2008).

The largest groups of people with an immigrant background in Germany are people that have Turkey, Poland and Russia as their ancestral homelands.

, the population by background was as follows:

Four other sizable groups of people are referred to as "national minorities" (nationale Minderheiten) because they have lived in their respective regions for centuries: Danes, Frisians, Roma and Sinti, and Sorbs. There is a Danish minority (about 50,000, according to government sources) in the northernmost state of Schleswig-Holstein. Eastern and Northern Frisians live at Schleswig-Holstein's western coast, and in the north-western part of Lower Saxony. They are part of a wider community (Frisia) stretching from Germany to the northern Netherlands. The Sorbs, a Slavic people with about 60,000 members (according to government sources), are in the Lusatia region of Saxony and Brandenburg. They are the last remnants of the Slavs that lived in central and eastern Germany since the 7th century to have kept their traditions and not been completely integrated into the wider German nation.

Until World War II the Poles were recognized as one of the national minorities. In 1924 the Union of Poles in Germany had initiated cooperation between all national minorities in Germany under the umbrella organization Association of National Minorities in Germany. Some of the union members wanted the Polish communities in easternmost Germany (now Poland) to join the newly established Polish nation after World War I. Even before the German invasion of Poland, leading anti-Nazi members of the Polish minority were deported to concentration camps; some were executed at the Piaśnica murder site. Minority rights for Poles in Germany were revoked by Hermann Göring's World War II decree of 27 February 1940, and their property was confiscated.

After the war ended, the German government did not re-implement national minority rights for ethnic Poles.  The reason for this is that the areas of Germany which formerly had a native Polish minority were annexed to Poland and the Soviet Union, while almost all of the native German populations (formerly the ethnic majority) in these areas subsequently fled or were expelled by force.  With the mixed German-Polish territories now lost, the German government subsequently regarded ethnic Poles residing in what remained of Germany as immigrants, just like any other ethnic population with a recent history of arrival.  In contrast, Germans living in Poland are recognized as national minority and have granted seats in Polish Parliament. It must be said, however, that an overwhelming number of Germans in Poland have centuries-old historical ties to the lands they now inhabit, whether from living in territory that once belonged to the German state, or from centuries-old communities. In contrast, most Poles in present-day Germany are recent immigrants, though there are some communities which have been present since the 19th and perhaps even the 18th centuries.  Despite protests by some in the older Polish-German communities, and despite Germany being now a signatory to the Framework Convention for the Protection of National Minorities, Germany has so far refused to re-implement minority rights for ethnic Poles, based on the fact that almost all areas of historically mixed German-Polish heritage (where the minority rights formerly existed) are no longer part of Germany and because the vast majority of ethnic Poles now residing in Germany are recent immigrants.

Roma people have been in Germany since the Middle Ages. They were persecuted by the Nazis, and thousands of Roma living in Germany were killed by the Nazi regime. Nowadays, they are spread all over Germany, mostly living in major cities. It is difficult to estimate their exact number, as the German government counts them as "persons without migrant background" in their statistics. There are also many assimilated Sinti and Roma. A vague figure given by the German Department of the Interior is about 70,000. In contrast to the old-established Roma population, the majority of them do not have German citizenship, and are classified as immigrants or refugees.

After World War II, 14 million ethnic Germans were expelled from the eastern territories of Germany and homelands outside the former German Empire. The accommodation and integration of these Heimatvertriebene in the remaining part of Germany, in which many cities and millions of apartments had been destroyed, was a major effort in the post-war occupation zones and later states of Germany.

Since the 1960s, ethnic Germans from the People's Republic of Poland and Soviet Union (especially from Kazakhstan, Russia, and Ukraine), have come to Germany. During the time of Perestroika, and after the dissolution of the Soviet Union, the number of immigrants increased heavily. Some of these immigrants are of mixed ancestry. During the 10-year period between 1987 and 2001, a total of 1,981,732 ethnic Germans from the FSU immigrated to Germany, along with more than a million of their non-German relatives. After 1997, however ethnic Slavs or those belonging to Slavic-Germanic mixed origins outnumbered those with only Germanic descent amongst the immigrants. The total number of people currently living in Germany having FSU connection is around 4 to 4.5 million (Including Germans, Slavs, Jews, and those of mixed origins), out of that more than 50% are of German descent.

Germany now has Europe's third-largest Jewish population. In 2004, twice as many Jews from former Soviet republics settled in Germany as in Israel, bringing the total inflow to more than 100,000 since 1991. Jews have a voice in German public life through the Central Council of Jews in Germany (Zentralrat der Juden in Deutschland). Some Jews from the former Soviet Union are of mixed heritage.

In 2019 there were also a growing number of at least 529,000 black Afro-Germans defined as people with an African migrant background. Out of them more than 400 thousand have a citizenship of a Subsahara-African country, with others being German citizens. Most of them live in Berlin and Hamburg. Numerous persons from northern African Tunisia and Morocco live in Germany. While they are considered members of a minority group, for the most part, they do not considers themselves "Afro-Germans," nor are most of them perceived as such by the German people. However, Germany does not keep any statistics regarding ethnicity or race. Hence, the exact number of Germans of African descent is unknown.

Germany's biggest East Asian minorities are the Chinese people in Germany, numbering 189,000
and Vietnamese people in Germany, numbering 188,000, many of whom living in Berlin and eastern Germany.
Also there are about 35,000 Japanese citizens residing in Germany. There are also groups of South Asian and Southeast Asian immigrants. Around 163,000 Indians and 124,000 Pakistanis live in Germany. Additionally some 30,000 Filipino citizens and more than 20,000 Indonesian citizens reside in Germany.

Numerous descendants of the so-called Gastarbeiter live in Germany. The Gastarbeiter mostly came from Turkey, Italy, Greece, Spain, Morocco, Portugal, the former Yugoslavia, Tunisia and Chile.
Also included were Vietnam, Mongolia, North Korea, Angola, Mozambique and Cuba when the former East Germany existed until reunification in 1990. The (socialist) German Democratic Republic (East Germany) however had their guest-workers stay in single-sex dormitories. Female guest workers had to sign contracts saying that they were not allowed to fall pregnant during their stay. If they fell pregnant nevertheless they faced forced abortion or deportation. This is one of the reasons why the vast majority of ethnic minorities today lives in western Germany and also one of the reasons why minorities such as the Vietnamese have the most unusual population pyramid, with nearly all second-generation Vietnamese Germans born after 1989.

Foreign nationals in Germany 
, the most common groups of resident foreign nationals in Germany were as follows:

This list does not include non-ethnic Germans with German nationality and foreign nationals without resident status.

Population density and distribution

With an estimated 83.2 million inhabitants in December 2020, Germany is the second-most populous country in Europe after Russia, and ranks as the 19th largest country in the world in terms of population. Its population density stands at 233 inhabitants per square kilometer.

States
Germany comprises sixteen states that are collectively referred to as Länder. Due to differences in size and population the subdivision of these states varies, especially between city-states (Stadtstaaten) and states with larger territories (Flächenländer). For regional administrative purposes four states, namely Baden-Württemberg, Bavaria, Hesse and North Rhine-Westphalia, consist of a total of 19 Government Districts (Regierungsbezirke). As of 2019 Germany is divided into 400 districts (Kreise) on municipal level, these consist of 294 rural districts and 106 urban districts.

Urbanization

Germany officially has eleven metropolitan regions. In 2005, Germany had 82 cities with more than 100,000 inhabitants.

Immigration
 

The United Nations Population Fund lists Germany as host to the third-highest number of international migrants worldwide, behind the United States and Saudi Arabia. The largest ethnic group of non-German origin are the Turkish. Since the 1960s, West and later reunified Germany has attracted immigrants primarily from Southern and Eastern Europe as well as Turkey, many of whom (or their children) have acquired German citizenship over time. While most of these immigrants initially arrived as guest workers, changes to guest worker legislation allowed many to stay and to build lives in Germany.

Germany had signed special visa agreements with several countries in times of severe labour shortages or when particular skills were deficient within the country. During the 1960s and 1970s, agreements were signed with the governments of Turkey, Yugoslavia, Italy and Spain to help Germany overcome its severe labour shortage.

As of 2012, after Germany fully legalized visa-free immigrants from the eastern states of the EU, the largest sources of net immigration to Germany were other European countries, most importantly Poland, Romania, Bulgaria, Hungary, Italy, Spain, and Greece; notably, in the case of Turkey, German Turks moving to Turkey slightly outnumbered new immigrants in 2012, however, in recent years there are more Turkish immigrants in Germany than emigrants again, including illegal Turkish migrants.

In 2015, there was a large increase in asylum applications, mainly due to the violent conflicts in Syria, Iraq and Afghanistan: 476,649 asylum applications were counted that year. This number went up to even 745,545 in 2016 and began to decline after it.

Education

Responsibility for educational oversight in Germany lies primarily with the individual federated states. Since the 1960s, a reform movement has attempted to unify secondary education into a Gesamtschule (comprehensive school); several West German states later simplified their school systems to two or three tiers. A system of apprenticeship called Duale Ausbildung ("dual education") allows pupils in vocational training to learn in a company as well as in a state-run vocational school.

Optional kindergarten education is provided for all children between three and six years old, after which school attendance is compulsory for at least nine years, depending on the state. Primary education usually lasts for four years and public schools are not stratified at this stage. In contrast, secondary education includes three traditional types of schools focused on different levels of academic ability: the Gymnasium enrols the most academically promising children and prepares students for university studies; the Realschule for intermediate students lasts six years; the Hauptschule prepares pupils for vocational education.

In addition Germany has a comprehensive school known as the Gesamtschule. While some German schools such as the Gymnasium and the Realschule have rather strict entrance requirements, the Gesamtschule does not have such requirements. They offer college preparatory classes for the students who are doing well, general education classes for average students, and remedial courses for those who aren't doing that well. In most cases students attending a Gesamtschule may graduate with the Hauptschulabschluss, the Realschulabschluss or the Abitur depending on how well they did in school.
The percentage of students attending a Gesamtschule varies by Bundesland. In 2007 the State of Brandenburg more than 50% of all students attended a Gesamtschule, while in the State of Bavaria less than 1% did.

The general entrance requirement for university is Abitur, a qualification normally based on continuous assessment during the last few years at school and final examinations; however there are a number of exceptions, and precise requirements vary, depending on the state, the university and the subject. Germany's universities are recognised internationally; in the Academic Ranking of World Universities (ARWU) for 2008, six of the top 100 universities in the world are in Germany, and 18 of the top 200. Nearly all German universities are public institutions, tuition fees in the range of €500 were introduced in some states after 2006, but quickly abolished again until 2014.

Percentage of jobholders holding Hauptschulabschluss, Realschulabschluss or Abitur in Germany

Literacy
Over 99% of those of age 15 and above are estimated to be able to read and write. However, a growing number of inhabitants are functionally illiterate. The young are much more likely to be functionally illiterate than the old. According to a study done by the University of Bremen in cooperation with the "Bundesverband Alphabetisierung e.V.", 10% of youngsters living in Germany are functionally illiterate and one quarter are able to understand only basic level texts. Illiteracy rates of youngsters vary by ethnic group and parents' socioeconomic class.

Health

The life expectancy in Germany is 81.1 years (78.7 years males, 83.6 years females, 2020 est.). 
, the principal cause of death was cardiovascular disease, at 42%, followed by malignant tumours, at 25%.
, about 82,000 Germans had been infected with HIV/AIDS and 26,000 had died from the disease (cumulatively, since 1982).
According to a 2005 survey, 27% of German adults are smokers.
A 2009 study shows Germany is near the median in terms of overweight and obese people in Europe.

Religion

The national constitutions of 1919 and 1949 guarantee freedom of faith and religion; earlier, these freedoms were mentioned only in state constitutions. The modern constitution of 1949 also states that no one may be discriminated against due to their faith or religious opinions. A state church does not exist in Germany (see Freedom of religion in Germany).

According to a 1990s poll by Der Spiegel, 45% of Germans believe in God, and a quarter in Jesus Christ. According to the Eurobarometer Poll 2010, 44% of German citizens responded that "they believe there is a God", 25% responded that "they believe there is some sort of spirit or life force" and 27% responded that "they don't believe there is any sort of spirit, God or life force". 4% gave no response.

Christianity is the largest religion in Germany, comprising an estimated 53.9% of the country's population.

Smaller religious groups (less than 1%) include Judaism, Buddhism and Hinduism.

The two largest churches, the Roman Catholic Church and the Protestant Evangelical Church in Germany (EKD), have lost significant number of adherents. In 2020 the Catholic Church accounted for 26.7% and the Evangelical Church for 24.3% of the population. Orthodox Church has 1.9% and other Christian churches and groups summed up to 1.1% of the population. Since the reunification of Germany, the number of non-religious people has grown and an estimated 40.7% of the country's population are not affiliated with any church or religion.

The other religions make up to less than 1% of the population. Buddhism has around 200,000 adherents (0.2%), Judaism has around 200,000 adherents (0.2%), Hinduism 90,000 (0.1%), Sikhism 75,000 (0.1%) and Yazidis religion (45,000–60,000). All other religious communities in Germany have fewer than 50,000 (<0.1%) adherents.

Protestantism is concentrated in the north and east and Roman Catholicism is concentrated in the south and west. According to the last nationwide census, Protestantism is more widespread among the population with German citizenship; there are slightly more Catholics total because of the Catholic immigrant population (including such groups as Poles and Italians). The former Pope, Benedict XVI, was born in Bavaria. Non-religious people, including atheists and agnostics, might make up as many as 55% of the total population, and are especially numerous in the former East Germany and major metropolitan areas.

Of the roughly 4 million Muslims, most are Sunnis and Alevites from Turkey, but there are a small number of Shi'ites and other denominations. 1.9% of the country's overall population declare themselves Orthodox Christians, with Serbs, Greeks, Romanians, Ukrainians and Russians being the most numerous. Germany has Europe's third-largest Jewish population (after France and the United Kingdom). In 2004, twice as many Jews from former Soviet republics settled in Germany as in Israel, bringing the total Jewish population to more than 200,000, compared to 30,000 prior to German reunification. Large cities with significant Jewish populations include Berlin, Frankfurt and Munich. Around 250,000 active Buddhists live in Germany; 50% of them are Asian immigrants.

2011 Census

Census results were as follows:

 Roman Catholic Church: 24,740,380 or 30.8% of the German population;
 Evangelical Church: 24,328,100 or 30.3% of the German population;
 Other, atheist or not specified (including Protestants outside EKD): 31,151,210 or 38.9% of the German population.

Languages

German is the only official and most widely spoken language. Standard German is understood throughout the country.

In 2021, the Federal Statistical Office of Germany included a new question regarding the language spoken at home in the micro-census, a large sample survey that yearly covers approximately 1% of the German population living in private households, and the results were as follows:

Minority languages

Danish, Low German, Low Rhenish, the Sorbian languages (Lower Sorbian and Upper Sorbian), and the two Frisian languages, Saterfrisian and North Frisian, are officially recognized and protected as minority languages by the European Charter for Regional or Minority Languages in their respective regions. With speakers of Romany living in all parts of Germany, the federal government has promised to take action to protect the language. Until now, only Hesse has followed Berlin's announcement, and agreed on implementing concrete measures to support Romany speakers.

Implementation of the Charter is poor. The monitoring reports on charter implementation in Germany show many provisions unfulfilled.

High German dialects

German dialects – some quite distinct from the standard language – are used in everyday speech, especially in rural regions. Many dialects, for example the Upper German varieties, are to some degree cultivated as symbols of regional identity and have their own literature, theaters and some TV programming. While speaking a dialect outside its native region might be frowned upon, in their native regions some dialects can be spoken by all social classes. . Nevertheless, partly due to the prevalence of Standard German in media, the use of dialects has declined over the past century, especially in the younger population.

The social status of different German dialects can vary greatly. The Alemannic and Bavarian dialects of the south are positively valued by their speakers and can be used in almost all social circumstances. The Saxonian and Thuringian dialects have less prestige and are subject to derision. While Bavarian and Alemannic have kept much of their distinctiveness, the Middle German dialects, which are closer to Standard German, have lost some of their distinctive lexical and grammatical features and tend to be only pronunciation variants of Standard German.

Low Saxon dialects

Low Saxon is officially recognized as a language on its own, but despite this fact, there's little official action taken on fostering the language. Historically one third of Germany's territory and population was Low Saxon speaking. No data was ever collected on the actual number of speakers, but today the number of speakers ranges around 5 million persons. Despite this relatively high number of speakers there is very little coverage in the media (mostly on NDR TV, no regular programming) and very little education in or on the language. The language is not fixed as part of the school curriculum and Low Saxon is used as a medium of instruction in one school only in the whole Germany (as a "model project" in primary school sided by education in Standard German). As a consequence the younger generation refused to adopt the native language of their parents. Language prevalence dropped from more than 90% (depending on the exact region) in the 1930s to less than 5% today. This accounts for a massive intergenerational gap in language use. Older people regularly use the language and take private initiative to maintain the language, but the lack of innovative potential of the younger generation hinders language maintenance. The language too has an own literature (around 150 published books every year) and there are many theatres (mostly lay stages, but some professional ones, like for example Ohnsorg-Theater).

Use of Low Saxon is mainly restricted to use among acquaintances, like family members, neighbours and friends. A meeting of a village council can be held almost completely in Low Saxon if all participants know each other (as long as written protocols are written in Standard German), but a single foreigner can make the whole switching to Standard German.

The Low Saxon dialects are different in their status too. There's a north–south gradient in language maintenance. The Southern dialects of Westfalian, Eastfalian and Brandenburgish have had much stronger speaker losses, than the northern coastal dialects of Northern Low Saxon. While Eastfalian has lost speakers to Standard German, Westfalian has lost speakers to Standard German and Standard German based regiolect of the Rhine-Ruhr area. Brandenburgish speakers mostly switched to the Standard German-based regiolect of Berlin. Brandenburgish is almost completely replaced by the Berlin regiolect. Northern Low Saxon speakers switched mostly to pure Standard German.

Foreign languages
English is the most common foreign language and almost universally taught by the secondary level; it is also taught at elementary level in some states. Other commonly-taught languages are French, Italian, Spanish, Portuguese, and Russian. Dutch is taught in states bordering the Netherlands, and Polish in the eastern states bordering Poland. Latin and Ancient Greek are part of the classical education syllabus offered in many secondary schools.

According to a 2004 survey, two-thirds of Germany's citizens have at least basic knowledge of English. About 20% consider themselves to be competent speakers of French, followed by speakers of Russian (7%), Italian (6.1%), and Spanish (5.6%). The relatively high number of Russian speakers is a result of immigration from the former Soviet Union to Germany for almost 10 consecutive years, plus its having been learned in school by many older former East Germans as compulsory first foreign language.

See also

 Germans
 Census in Germany

Notes

References

External links

 Homepage of the Federal Statistical Office Germany (in English)
 German demographics in Online-Databank HISTAT  (in German, Registration needed)
 Dossier "The Aging Society" of the Goethe-Institut
 Demographic Profile Germany: United in Decline Allianz Knowledge